Thomas Cappelen Malling (born 16 December 1970) is a Norwegian author and director, born in Kongsvinger.
He hails from the Communications Industry, where he worked in Strategic planning. In 2006, Malling wrote the book Ninjateknikk II. Usynlighet i strid 1978
("Ninja Technique II: Invisibility in combat 1978"). The book was presented as a military manual written in 1978 by Arne Treholt, who in 1985 was convicted of high treason and espionage on behalf of the Soviet Union and Iraq. In spite of the fact that he had no previous experience from the movie industry, Malling in December 2008 received NOK 10,5 million in support from the Norwegian Film Institute to make a film based on the book.
In the film, slated for release in August 2010 under the title Norwegian Ninja, an alternative universe-Treholt leads a group of ninjas set up by then-King Olav V to combat the Soviets. 
Treholt himself has allegedly given his consent to both the book and the movie.

References

External links
 
Biography from publishing house

1970 births
Norwegian male writers
Norwegian film directors
People from Kongsvinger
Living people
Cappelen family